Kahana may refer to:

People 
Abraham Kahana (1874–1946), writer
Amalia Kahana-Carmon (born 1926), Israeli author, educator
Boaz Kahana, American psychologist
Eliezer Kahana, Jewish preacher and homiletic exegete in Karlin, Belarus
Eva Kahana, American sociologist
Jacob ben Abraham Kahana (died 1826), rabbinical author
Kahana b. Tahlifa, Jewish Talmudist who lived in Babylonia, known as an amora of the third century
Kalman Kahana (1910-1991), Israeli politician and journalist
Matan Kahana (born 1972), Israeli politician
Pesikta de-Rav Kahana, a collection of Aggadic Midrash which exists in two editions
Rav Kahana II, Jewish Amora sage, active in Babylon and in the Land of Israel
 Rav Kahana IV, Jewish Amora sage of Babylon

Places

Hawaii
 Ahupua'a O Kahana State Park, formerly Kahana Valley State Park on Oahu
Kahana Bay and Kahana Bay Beach Park on windward Oahu

Pakistan
 Kahana, Pakistan, a village in Gujrat District, Pakistan

Other 
 ITC Kahana, a typeface
 Kahana, the freighter ship owned by Charles Widmore in the series Lost

See also 
 Kahane, a surname
 Kahuna (disambiguation)

Jewish surnames
Kohenitic surnames